KJ Smithis an American actress known for her roles in various television shows and films. She was born on May 6, 1987, in Tallahassee, Florida, USA.

Education 
She studied Business Marketing at Florida State University. where she earned her bachelor's degree and later went on to work in corporate America. Smith later went back to further her education at Florida A&M University where she studied journalism.

Career 
Smith began her acting career in 2009 and has appeared in several other shows, including The Quad, The Fix, and Queen Sugar.

In 2018, Smith landed her breakthrough role as Andrea "Andi" Barnes in the hit television series Sistas on BET.

Smith can also be seen starring in the role of Palomar in season two of the Power prequel series, Power Book III: Raising Kanan, on STARZ. Smith starred in the lead role in The Available Wife (2020) as Nicole Wright.

Additional television credits for Smith in top-rated network and cable television include the CW's drama series, Dynasty, Issa Rae's Giants, CBS' NCIS: Los Angeles, ABC's Black-ish, Freeform's The Fosters, Fox's Lethal Weapon, Netflix's Fuller House, three-season recurring roles on Bounce TV's Family Time and BET's The Family Business, Netflix's Family Reunion and #BlackAF, CBS' All Rise, and ABC's legal drama The Fix, where Smith starred as a paralegal, Charlie.

In addition to her work on television, Smith has also appeared in several films, including The Possession of Hannah Grace, Lionsgate's A Madea Family Funeral (2019) and Fatal Affair.

Personal life 
Smith is engaged to actor and Sistas co-star Skyh Alvester Black.

Filmography

Film/Movie

Television

References

External links

21st-century American actresses
African-American actresses
American film actresses
American television actresses
Living people
Florida State University alumni
21st-century African-American women
21st-century African-American people
Year of birth missing (living people)